The Miami Hurricanes men's basketball represent the University of Miami in the Atlantic Coast Conference in Division I of the NCAA. They have played their home games at the BankUnited Center since 2003. The program's first squad played in 1926. From 1971 through 1985, the men's basketball program was suspended due to lack of adequate funding. The program reached has reached the NCAA Tournament seven times, most recently in 2013.

Overall, there have been 12 head coaches for the Miami Hurricanes, five since the revival of the program in 1985 with Bill Foster. Bruce Hale, who led the Hurricanes to its first NCAA Tournament appearance in 1960, is the school's all-time leader in games coached and wins. Leonard Hamilton was named UPI National Coach of the Year in 1995. Jim Larrañaga is the current coach of the Hurricanes and was named the AP Coach of the Year in 2013.

Key

Coaches
Note: Statistics are correct through March 27, 2022.

Notes
A running total of the number of coaches of the Hurricanes. Thus, any coach who has two or more separate terms as head coach is only counted once.

References
General

Specific

Miami

Miami Hurricanes basketball, men's, coaches
Miami Hurricanes basketball, men's, coaches